Eusynthemis cooloola is a species of dragonfly of the family Synthemistidae,
known as the Cooloola tigertail. 
It is a medium-sized dragonfly with black and yellow markings.
It has been found along a creek in the Cooloola sand-mass of south-eastern Queensland, Australia.

See also
 List of Odonata species of Australia

References

Synthemistidae
Odonata of Australia
Insects of Australia
Endemic fauna of Australia
Taxa named by Günther Theischinger
Insects described in 2018